This is a list of venues used for professional baseball in Kansas City, Missouri. The information is a compilation of the information contained in the references listed.

Athletic Park
Home of: Kansas City Cowboys/Unions – UA (1884 part)
Location: Southwest Boulevard; Summit Street
Currently: commercial

Association Park (I) orig. League Park aka "The Hole"
Home of: Kansas City Cowboys/Blues – NL (1886), Western League (1887), AA (1888)
Location: Lydia Avenue (east, first base); Sixth Street (south, third base); John Street and Tracy Avenue (west, left field); Independence Avenue (north, right field) [per contemporary newspapers]
Currently: Al-Taqwa Islamic Center

Exposition Park
Home of:
Kansas City Blues – AA (1889)
Kansas City Blues – Western Association (1888, 1890–1891) / Western League (1892) / WA (1893) / WL (1894–1899) / American League (1900) / WL (1901)
Location: East 15th Street (now Truman Avenue) (south, first base); imaginary line of Montgall Avenue (west, third base) + Prospect Avenue (farther west); imaginary line of East 14th Street + Exposition Driving Park (north, left field); buildings and Kansas Avenue (east, right field)
Currently: commercial / industrial

Sportsman's Park aka Recreation Park
Home of: Kansas City Blue Stockings / Cowboys – Western League (1902–1903)
Location: Indiana Avenue (west); 17th Street (south) [per city directories]
Currently: commercial / I-70 underpass

Shelley Park
Home of: Kansas City Royal Giants – Negro leagues, Western Independent Clubs (1910–1912)
Location: Oak Street (west); Missouri Avenue (north); Locust Lane (east); Independence Avenue (south)
Currently: fire station / I-35 & Hwy 9 interchange

Association Park (II)
Home of:
Kansas City Blues – AA (1902–1922)
Kansas City Monarchs – Negro leagues (1920–1922)
Location: railroad tracks and 19th Street (north, third base); Olive Street (west, first base); 21st Street (south, right field); Prospect Avenue (east, left field) – a couple of blocks northeast of the site of Muehlebach Field
Currently: Blues Park, a public park

Gordon and Koppel Field
Home of: Kansas City Packers – FL (1914–1915)
Location: The Paseo (east, left field?); 47th Street (north, third base?) (approximates Emanual Cleaver II Boulevard); Tracy Avenue (west, first base?); Brush Creek (south, right field?)
Currently: Kiely Park and commercial businesses

Municipal Stadium prev. Blues Stadium, Ruppert Stadium; orig. Muehlebach Field
Home of:
Kansas City Blues – AA (1923–1954)
Kansas City Monarchs – Negro National League (1923–1927, 1929–1930) / Negro American League (1937–1950)
Kansas City Athletics – AL (1955–1967)
Kansas City Royals – AL (1969–1972)
Location: Brooklyn Avenue (east, right field); 22nd Street (south, first base); Euclid Avenue (west, third base); 21st Street (north, left field)
Currently: community garden, public park

Kauffman Stadium originally Royals Stadium
Home of: Kansas City Royals – AL (1973–present)
Location: One Royal Way – Royal Way, Chiefs Way, Arrowhead Stadium (southwest, home plate); Red Coat Drive, Blue Ridge Cutoff (southeast, first base); Spectacular Drive, Interstate-70 (northeast, center field); Lancer Lane, Stadium Drive, Interstate-435 (northwest, third base) – part of Truman Sports Complex

CommunityAmerica Ballpark
Home of: Kansas City Monarchs (American Association) formerly Kansas City T-Bones Northern League (2003-2009) / American Association (2010-present)
Location: 1800 Village West Pkwy (northeast, center field), Kansas City, KANSAS; State Avenue (south, first base); Sunflower Lane (east, right field); service road and Stadium Drive (northwest, left field); parking lots, hotel and North 110th Street (west, third base)

See also
Lists of baseball parks

External links
Illustration of League Park, 1886
Sanborn map showing the ballpark portion of Exposition Park, 1909
Sanborn map showing Association Park (II), 1909

References
Peter Filichia, Professional Baseball Franchises, Facts on File, 1993.

The Federal League of 1914–1915, by Marc Okkonen, SABR, 1989.

Kansas City
Baseball parks
baseball parks
Kansas City